Ralph Lyonel Brydges (1856 – 18 April 1946) was an English Protestant pastor and paedophile who was accused of being The Monster of Rome (Italian: Il mostro di Roma), a suspected serial killer of young girls who was active in Rome, Italy from 1924 to 1927. Another man, photographer Gino Girolimoni, was wrongfully accused but later exonerated of the crimes, for which Inspector Giuseppe Dosi later accused Brydges of committing.

Brydges was never tried for the crimes, amidst pressure from the British government, and later left Italy, supposedly committing other killings in other countries before his death in 1946.

"The Monster of Rome"
Between the period of 1924 to 1927, Rome was hit by a series of kidnappings, rapes and murders, to which seven little girls fell prey. The first of them was 4-year-old Emma Giacomini, who was kidnapped while playing in a public garden in Monte Mario on March 31, 1924. Later that day, her body, showing signs of violence but no sexual assault, was found. The newspapers became interpreters of popular anguish and demands that the person responsible be arrested. Benito Mussolini himself, disappointed by the failures of the investigators and fearing that the prestige of his regime could be affected, appointed Chief of Police Arturo Bocchini as the main investigator.

A few months later, on June 4, 3-year-old Bianca Carlieri was found raped and strangled inside the Basilica of Saint Paul Outside the Walls; on November 24, 4-year-old Rosa Pelli was kidnapped and later found murdered in the Basilica. The latter's funeral was attended by over one hundred thousand people who, especially in the poorer areas of the city, were on the verge of starting riots in demand of capturing the killer. Despite pressure from the fascist regime to capture the murderer, other attacks soon followed. On May 28, 1925, 6-year-old Elsa Berni disappeared, with her body later found at the Lungotevere Gianicolense. On August 26, an 18-month-old baby girl, Celeste Tagliaferro was found still alive at the Scalo Tuscolano, while 6-year-old Elvira Coletti was also found alive near the Michelangelo Bridge. On March 12, 1927, 5-year-old Armanda Leonardi was found murdered on Aventine Hill. All five murder victims showed the same signs of sexual and physical abuse.

In particular, the second case, that of Bianca Carlieri (the so-called Crime of Biochetta), raised a wave of indignation throughout the country for the entire month of June in 1924. A huge crowd attended her funeral and, for days, the press carried the news with headlines that aimed to fuel the desire to restore justice and order. The public ire soon began to center around the assassination of socialist politician Giacomo Matteotti.

Miscarriage of justice
The police arrested numerous individuals, focusing predominantly on cripples and the mentally ill. One man, 38-year-old driver Amedeo Sterbini, who was described as a violent and quarrelsome character, even committed suicide by drinking muriatic acid. In his pockets, two letters were found in which he proclaimed himself as innocent and stated that he would rather kill himself than risk being arrested. Pressure from superiors, the media and the public prompted the police to immediately search for a culprit and, despite numerous witnesses describing the killer as a tall man in his 50s who dressed neatly and sported a moustache, the policemen arrested Gino Girolimoni, a young photographer who was known as a nice, polite individual. The news of his arrest was published in the newspapers with great prominence, announcing that the "Monster of Rome" had finally been captured.

On May 9, 1927, the Agenzia Stefani wrote that after "laborious investigations", the investigators had uncovered "irrefutable evidence" against Girolimoni. Even the criminalist Samuele Ottolenghi, a follower of Lombrosian philosophy, claimed to recognize several somatic traits in the arrested man.

Girolimoni's arrest came about after a 13-year-old waitress told her landlord about a man who spoke to her from time to time; suspicious, the landlord waited for the stranger to show up, wrote down his license plate numbers and later informed police, who promptly arrested Girolimoni. The evidence against him was flimsy - at the time, it was pointed out that 12 dresses had been found in his closet, supposedly demonstrating that he changed often with different outfits while attacking and to avoid detection. Despite the lack of concrete evidence, the investigators pressured him into confessing for four months, but Girolimoni never did. He was also accused of other crimes, such as the murder of a little girl in Padua in 1919, which he also denied. It all ended when, on March 8, 1928, he was acquitted of all charges due to discrepancies found in the testimonies collected before and after his arrest, some of which was later found to be fabricated. The acquittal received barely any press coverage, however: for example, the newspaper La Tribuna gave the news in a small paragraph on page four. Girolimoni's reputation was irreparably tarnished even after his acquittal, and he died in poverty in 1961, having never been compensated for the wrongful accusation.

Further investigations
During Girolimoni's incarceration, a police commissioner by the name of Giuseppe Dosi was allowed access to the case files. After reading through them, he became convinced of his innocence and opposed his superiors, for which he was arrested and interned at an insane asylum for seventeen months. He was released in 1940 and reintegrated to the police force after the fall of fascism, working on important cases in the country, and later wrote a book presenting his findings on the case.

During the investigation, Dosi identified a more likely suspect: an English pastor named Ralph Lyonel Bridges, born in Cheltenham in 1856, a deacon at The Holy Trinity Church of England in via Romagna who had been repeatedly accused of molesting children while serving in New York City, but had never been convicted. After returning to his native England, he held the office of a military chaplain for some time, during which he reportedly suffered a bad head injury. He settled in Rome with his Canadian wife, Florence Caroline Jarvis, sometime in 1922, settling in an apartment in via Po where the pair resided until the spring of 1927. During this time, the murders attributed to the Monster of Rome occurred.

On April 24, 1927, while on vacation in Capri, Brydges was arrested by the island's commissioner after being caught attempting to molest a young English girl, Patricia Blakensee, at the hotel. The commissioner was convinced that his guest had a profile compatible with that of the murderer, and was made additionally suspicious of the former's refusal to have his fingerprints taken. However, his English nationality and discrepancy between his age and the supposed profile of the killer (which had been set at roughly 40), led to the English consulate in Naples to pressure for his release. Despite protests, Brydges' release was secured on May 7. Not long after, the couple fled back to Rome, where their track was lost.

On April 13, 1928, Brydges was travelling on board a ship returning from Beira, Mozambique and returning to Canada. While the ship was anchored at the Port of Genoa, Dosi, who had begun investigating him after hearing testimony from a maid in Rome who described a man similar in appearance to him, boarded the ship and demanded that to inspect Brydges' private quarters. While searching his bunkbed, the inspector found notes that referred to the times and places of the crimes: among them including a "St. Peter's Square" (from where Pelli was kidnapped), and the name "Charleri", which was similar to the surname of victim Bianca Carlieri. What stuck out in particular were handkerchiefs engraved with the initials "R.L.", which resembled a handkerchief found next to Pelli's body. In addition, Dosi noted that, much like what the Capri commissioner had told him, Brydges' left hand, except for one finger, was completely paralyzed. In the interrogations, Dosi also asked the pastor if he had ever used catalogs of ascetic books or art, as the crumpled, scorched remnants of one were found next to the body of Armanda Leonardi. To his shock, Brydges replied in the positive, claiming that he had picked some up from the Mowbray Library - however, this did not directly incriminate him, as that particular library was heavily frequented by clerics at the time.

Using this circumstantial evidence, and in spite of protests from representatives of the British consulate, Dosi formally arrested Brydges and subsequently had him imprisoned at a mental asylum in Santa Maria della Pietà. During his stay there, he was subjected to psychiatric examinations, which deduced that he was not a danger to society. Following mounting pressure from the Church of England and the British consulate, Brydges was released after three months and allowed to travel to Toronto, Canada. By October 23, 1929, he was formally acquitted after a preliminary investigation by the Supreme Court of Cassation, but by that time, he had long left the country.

Aftermath
According to Dosi's theories, Brydges was responsible for four other murders during his international travels, all committed in countries in which he has resided from 1923 to 1928. Aside from the Rome murders, he accused him of two similar killings in Johannesburg, South Africa, and two each in Geneva, Switzerland and Germany. None of these murders were ever solved, and Brydges later died on April 18, 1946, in Daytona Beach, Florida. For unclear reasons, some newspapers reports have incorrectly stated that Brydges had been arrested and subsequently executed for the crime he committed in South Africa.

Doubt still exists whether Brydges was actually the killer or not. In contrast to Dosi's investigations, he did not speak Italian; did not have the necessary vehicle to commit the crimes and witnesses gave conflicting descriptions of the supposed killer. He even had a solid alibi for at least one of the murders, as he was on vacation in northern Italy at the time. In the end, while Dosi's research indicated that he was indeed a child molester, it did not conclusively prove that Brydges himself was the elusive Monster of Rome.

See also
 List of serial killers by country

Bibliography
 Fausto Bassini, The monster and the commissioner who chased him to Genoa, Il Giornale, 9 May 2012.
 Cristiano Armati, Yari Selvetella. Criminal Rome, pp 62–76. Roma, Newton Compton, 2006. .
 Damiano Damiani, Gaetano Strazzulla. Girolimoni: the monster and fascism. Bologna, Cappelli, 1972.
 Giuseppe Dosi, My autobiographical will, Vasto (Chieti), 1938.
 Giuseppe Dosi, The monster and the detective. Firenze, Vallecchi, 1973.
 Massimo Polidoro, Chronicle, p. 23-68. Casale Monferrato, Edizioni Piemme, 2005. .
 Fabio Sanvitale, Armando Palmegiani: A monster called Girolimoni: A story of serial killers, girls and innocents. Roma, Sovera, 2011, .
 Federica Sciarelli, Emmanuele Agostini. The innocent monster. The truth about Girolimoni condemned by the news and history. Milano, Rizzoli, 2010. .

References 

1856 births
1946 deaths
Child sexual abuse in Italy
Criminals from Gloucestershire
English Protestant ministers and clergy
People acquitted of murder
People acquitted of sex crimes
People from Cheltenham
Suspected serial killers
Violence against children